Adrian Denard Jones (born June 10, 1981) is a former American football offensive guard.  He was drafted by the New York Jets in the fourth round of the 2004 NFL Draft. He played college football at Kansas.

Jones has also played for the Kansas City Chiefs.

Professional career

Pittsburgh Steelers
On July 21, 2010, Jones signed with the Pittsburgh Steelers.  Jones was released August 31, 2010.

References

1981 births
Living people
American football offensive guards
Houston Texans players
Kansas Jayhawks football players
New York Jets players
Kansas City Chiefs players
Pittsburgh Steelers players
Players of American football from Dallas